David Merrill McConkie (born October 13, 1948) is an American lawyer and was a member of the general presidency of the Sunday School of the Church of Jesus Christ of Latter-day Saints (LDS Church) from 2009 to 2014.

McConkie was raised in Bountiful, Utah. From 1969 to 1971 he was a missionary for the LDS Church in South Africa. He attended the University of Utah and earned a bachelor's degree in history and a Juris Doctor.

McConkie became a lawyer at the Salt Lake City firm of Kirton McConkie, the firm that represents the LDS Church in legal matters. (One of the founding partners of the firm was Oscar W. McConkie Jr., who is a relative of David M. McConkie.)

In the LDS Church, McConkie has been a bishop and a stake president. At the April 2009 general conference of the LDS Church, McConkie was accepted as the first counselor to Russell T. Osguthorpe in the general presidency of the church's Sunday School.

McConkie and his wife are the parents of seven children. He lives in North Salt Lake, Utah.

Publications
David M. McConkie, "Learning to Hear and Understand the Spirit", Liahona, Feb. 2011
David M. McConkie, "Gospel Learning and Teaching", Liahona, Nov. 2010

Notes

References
"NSL resident called to LDS Sunday School", The Davis Clipper, 2009-04-09
"News of the Church: David M. McConkie", Liahona, May 2009

External links
"General Authorities and General Officers: Brother David M. McConkie", churchofjesuschrist.org

1948 births
American leaders of the Church of Jesus Christ of Latter-day Saints
American Mormon missionaries in South Africa
Utah lawyers
Counselors in the General Presidency of the Sunday School (LDS Church)
20th-century Mormon missionaries
University of Utah alumni
McConkie family
Living people
People from North Salt Lake, Utah
People from Bountiful, Utah
Latter Day Saints from Utah